Ulidia fascialis is a species of ulidiid or picture-winged fly in the genus Ulidia of the family Tephritidae.

References

Ulidia